James Thomas Reid McManus (October 1, 1874 – November 11, 1948) was a Canadian politician. He served in the Legislative Assembly of New Brunswick as member of the Liberal party representing Westmorland County from 1921 to 1925.

References

20th-century Canadian politicians
1874 births
1948 deaths
New Brunswick Liberal Association MLAs